Zafar Sarfraz (30 October 1969 – 13 April 2020) was a Pakistani cricketer who played in 15 first-class and six List A matches between 1988 and 1992 for Peshawar cricket team.

He retired from playing competitive cricket in 1994. Following his retirement, he became a coach and was involved with the Peshawar Under-19 cricket team. He also worked for the National Bank of Pakistan.

In April 2020, Sarfaz died from COVID-19 complications in Peshawar, Pakistan. He was the first professional cricketer known to have died from coronavirus during the pandemic in Pakistan.

References

External links
 

1969 births
2020 deaths
Pakistani cricketers
Peshawar cricketers
Cricketers from Peshawar
Deaths from the COVID-19 pandemic in Khyber Pakhtunkhwa